Pterolophia univinculata is a species of beetle in the family Cerambycidae. It was described by Heller in 1924.

References

univinculata
Beetles described in 1924